Patrick Stoddart (born 1944), is a British journalist, media consultant and presenter who was the media editor and television critic of The Sunday Times.
 
He attended Watford Grammar School for Boys and began his career in journalism with the Watford Observer. He then worked for the London Evening News. He has also presented television and radio programmes including The Media Show  and has worked for ITV, Channel 4 and Radio 4. In 1992 he won a celebrity special edition of Fifteen to One. He later founded a media consultancy and became a senior lecturer in journalism at the University of Westminster.

References

External links
 

1944 births
Living people
People educated at Watford Grammar School for Boys
British journalists
The Times journalists